Naphthoflavone may refer to:

 alpha-Naphthoflavone (7,8-benzoflavone)
 beta-Naphthoflavone (5,6-benzoflavone)